Rutgers University is a public research university with campuses in New Brunswick, Newark, and Camden, New Jersey, U.S.

Rutgers may also refer to:
 Rutgers (surname), people with the Dutch surname Rutgers
 Rutgers Glacier, Antarctic glacier
 Rutgers Houses, New York City  public housing development
 Rutgers Nisso Group, Dutch expert centre on sexuality
 Rutgers Preparatory School, a private preparatory school in Somerset, New Jersey
 Rutgers Presbyterian Church, a church in New York City
 Rutgers Street, a street in New York City
 Rutgers World Population Foundation, population concern organization